Saddar Barkhan is town and union council of Barkhan District in the Balochistan province of Pakistan.

References

Populated places in Barkhan District
Union councils of Balochistan, Pakistan